Manuel Coelho is a Portuguese name, which may refer to any of the following people:

Manuel Maria Coelho, Portuguese military officer
Manuel Rodrigues Coelho, Portuguese composer
Manuel Coelho da Silva, Portuguese actor